María Salomé Elyd Sáenz  is a Mexican politician affiliated with the National Action Party. As of 2014 she served as Deputy of the LIX Legislature of the Mexican Congress as a plurinominal representative as replacement of Juan de Dios Castro Lozano.

References

Politicians from Durango
Women members of the Chamber of Deputies (Mexico)
Members of the Chamber of Deputies (Mexico)
National Action Party (Mexico) politicians
Living people
Year of birth missing (living people)
21st-century Mexican politicians
21st-century Mexican women politicians
Deputies of the LIX Legislature of Mexico